Patrick O'Connell (1944–2005) was a Canadian poet.

Born in Winnipeg, Manitoba, he was educated at the University of Manitoba. In 1993, he was the winner of the John Hirsch Award for Most Promising New Writer.

Bibliography
Hoping for Angels (1990) 
Falling in Place (1993)
The Joy that Cracked the Mountain (1999)

External links
Patrick O'Connell Profile

1944 births
2005 deaths
20th-century Canadian poets
Canadian male poets
Writers from Winnipeg
20th-century Canadian male writers